The Catholic Church in Barbados is part of the worldwide Catholic Church, under the spiritual leadership of the Pope in Rome. At first, Catholicism had difficulty establishing itself in Barbados, which early in its colonial history was primarily Protestant, but with the abolition of slavery there in 1838, it began to take root. Currently, Catholics comprise about 4% of churchgoing Barbadians under the Diocese of Bridgetown.

Churches
The Catholic churches in Barbados are:
St. Patrick's Cathedral, Bridgetown
Our Lady Queen of the Universe, Bridgetown
St. Dominic's Catholic Church, Christ Church
Our Lady of Sorrow, St. Peter
Our Lady of the Rosary Church, St.John
Sacred Heart Catholic Church, St.Phillip
St.Francis of Assisi Catholic Church, St.James

References

 
Barbados